Thandeka Moloko Mbabama (born 12 September 1956) is a South African politician of the Democratic Alliance who has been serving as the Shadow Deputy Minister  of Agriculture, Land Reform and Rural Development since June 2019. She has been a Member of Parliament (MP) since November 2016.
From January 2017 to June 2019, she was the Shadow Deputy Minister of Rural Development and Land Reform.

Career
Mbabama is a member of the Democratic Alliance. In 2016, she was elected to the National Assembly of South Africa  to replace Nqaba Bhanga. She was sworn into office on 8 November 2016. On 24 November 2016, DA parliamentary leader Mmusi Maimane appointed her to the post of Shadow Deputy Minister of Rural Development and Land Reform. Mbabama became a member of the Portfolio Committee on Rural Development and Land Reform on 8 December 2016. Her appointment as Shadow Deputy Minister took effect on 1 January 2017. Mbabama was appointed to the  Constitutional Review Committee in May 2018. In February 2019, she became a member of the Ad Hoc Committee to Amend Section 25 of the Constitution.

Mbabama returned to Parliament following the general election in May 2019. In June 2019, she was appointed Shadow Deputy Minister of Agriculture, Land Reform and Rural Development. In October 2019, she returned to the Ad Hoc committee to amend section 25 of the constitution as a non-voting member. On 5 December 2020, Mbabama was re-appointed to her shadow cabinet role by the newly elected DA leader, John Steenhuisen.

Views
Mbabama has been critical of expropriation without compensation. In March 2018, she voted against the motion. In May 2018, she blamed the ruling African National Congress for failed land reform programmes. Mbabama said in December 2018 that the ANC was using the new Land Expropriation Bill as an "electioneering tool".

References

External links
Ms Thandeka Moloko Mbabama at Parliament of South Africa

Living people
1956 births
Xhosa people
People from the Eastern Cape
Democratic Alliance (South Africa) politicians
Members of the National Assembly of South Africa
Women members of the National Assembly of South Africa